An astronaut-politician is a person who has entered politics after traveling to space as an astronaut. Even with the increasing number of individuals who have flown in space, astronauts still maintain a wide degree of public recognition, and those interested in pursuing a career in politics have been able to take advantage of their renown to enter politics at higher levels of elected office.

Brazil 
Brazilian astronaut Marcos Pontes is the first South American and Lusophone to go into space as part of the Missão Centenário. He participated in the Russian Soyuz TMA-8 mission to the International Space Station in 2006. Under Jair Bolsonaro's Presidency, Pontes was announced as Minister of Science, Technology and Innovation. In the 2022 São Paulo gubernatorial election Marcos Pontes was elected for the Brazilian Senate with 10.714.913 votes (49.68%).

Canada 
Canadian astronaut Marc Garneau became the first Canadian in space, when he flew in 1984 on the Space Shuttle Challenger on mission STS-41-G as a payload specialist. After two other Shuttle flights, Garneau entered politics and won a seat to the Parliament of Canada in 2008. Garneau was appointed as Minister of Transport by Prime Minister Justin Trudeau on November 4, 2015.

Canadian astronaut Julie Payette flew on STS-96 in 1999 and STS-127 in 2009 as a mission specialist. In 2017 she became the 29th Governor General of Canada, the viceregal representative of the Queen in Canada and a nonpartisan position within Canadian governance.

European countries 
Three individuals have made the journey to space and were later elected to become a Member of the European Parliament. Cosmonaut Vladimír Remek, who flew into space on Soyuz 28 in 1978 from Czechoslovakia as the first non-American or non-Soviet in space, was elected as an MEP in 2004 from the Czech Republic as an independent candidate for the Communist Party of Bohemia and Moravia, and was re-elected in 2009, with Deutsche Welle describing how "his huge communist-era fame contributed to his success at the ballot box". Italian astronaut Franco Malerba flew on Space Shuttle mission STS-46 on Atlantis and became the first Italian to travel to space in 1992, and was elected in June 1994 to the European Parliament, where he sits with the European People's Party. Also another Italian astronaut, Umberto Guidoni, flew on Space Shuttle mission STS-75 on Columbia and became the first European to visit the International Space Station when he was part of STS-100 aboard Endeavour in 2001, and was elected in June 2004 to the European Parliament, where he sits with the European United Left–Nordic Green Left.

Claudie Haigneré, a French spationaute, has been junior minister for Research and New Technologies, and junior minister for European Affairs, in a government led by Jean-Pierre Raffarin, but has never held elected office.

Astronaut and veteran of two space missions Pedro Duque has been named Minister of Science, Innovation and Universities of Spain in May 2018. He earned a degree in aeronautical engineering from the Universidad Politécnica de Madrid (UPM) in 1986.

Mongolia 

Jügderdemidiin Gürragchaa was the first Mongolian in space, flying on the Soyuz 39 mission in 1981. He served as the Minister of Defense of Mongolia from 2000 until 2004.

Russia 

In Russia, cosmonaut Yuri Baturin, described by Space.com in 2000 as "Russia's only cosmonaut / politician", became a senior aide to President Boris Yeltsin and served as one of that nation's leading space policy advisors.

All four female Russian cosmonauts have gone on to serve in the State Duma. Valentina Tereshkova, the first woman in space, entered politics in the days of the Soviet Union, serving in parliament and as a member of the Central Committee of the Communist Party. Svetlana Savitskaya, the second woman in space, was elected to the State Duma in 1996 and currently serves as Deputy Chair of the Committee on Defense, in addition to being a member of the Commission on Safety, Defense, and the Fight Against Crime in the Parliamentary Assembly of the Union of Belarus and Russia. Yelena Kondakova served in the Duma as a member of Fatherland – All Russia and later United Russia. She left United Russia in 2011 as a result of her dissatisfaction with results of internal party elections. Most recently, Yelena Serova, the first female Russian cosmonaut to visit the International Space Station, was elected to serve in the Duma in 2016.

United States 
In the United States, some major political leaders have attempted to draw astronauts into the political sphere.

John Glenn, one of the Mercury Seven selected in 1959 by NASA became the first American astronaut to orbit the earth when he flew the Mercury-Atlas 6 named Friendship 7 for three earth orbits on February 20, 1962, and the first astronaut elected to Congress when he won a Senate seat in 1974. He was the most successful American astronaut-politician thus far, serving 25 years in the Senate.

Glenn left the human spaceflight program in 1964 and announced that he would challenge incumbent U.S. Senator Stephen M. Young in the Democratic primary at the end of Young's first term in office. Criticism of "astronaut turned politician" Glenn immediately followed his announcement, with Republicans and Young supporters disagreeing with the "undesirable precedent in astronauts' capitalizing on their fame to enter political roles", and some grumbling that Glenn did not follow the standard "step-by-step progression up the political ladder" by "aspiring immediately for the Senate".

Many in Congress believed that Attorney General Robert F. Kennedy had promoted Glenn's electoral bid to increase Democrats' chances in the state in the 1964 United States presidential election. Kennedy stated that he had had "a number of conversations with John Glenn over his future". At the same time, the Democratic Party of Oklahoma reportedly discussed fellow Mercury astronaut Gordon Cooper as a candidate for the Senate. In an editorial shortly after the announcement, The Blade stated that Glenn "presumes too much on his popularity as a spaceman". A slip and fall in a bathtub in March 1964 ultimately led to Glenn's withdrawal from the race. Glenn ran again in 1970, losing the Ohio Senate primary to Howard Metzenbaum. In 1974, Glenn won election to the Senate in a special election to fill the seat of William B. Saxbe. In 1984, Glenn sought the Democratic nomination for President of the United States. He withdrew from the race in March 1984, after winning only two delegates and finishing in sixth place. Glenn returned to space on October 29, 1998, aboard Space Shuttle Discovery (STS-95) while still a sitting Senator. The next year he retired from Congress.

Two Apollo astronauts were elected to the United States Congress. Astronaut turned Senator, Harrison "Jack" Schmitt, whose participation on the Apollo 17 mission made him the only geologist to walk on the Moon, resigned from NASA in August 1975 and shortly thereafter ran as a Republican, winning the United States Senate in New Mexico seat in 1976 over two-term Democratic incumbent, Joseph Montoya by a margin of 57% to 42%, despite being described by The New York Times as a "political neophyte". Jack Swigert, who had flown on the ill-fated Apollo 13 mission, was elected in November 1982 to the United States House of Representatives representing Colorado, based on a plan he developed that "evolved from his training as an astronaut and the success of the Apollo exploration of the Moon", but died before taking office. Jack Lousma lost to incumbent Carl Levin in the 1984 United States Senate election in Michigan. Apollo 15 crew member Alfred Worden ran for Congress in 1982 to represent Florida's 12th congressional district, but lost the Republican primary to Tom Lewis.

NASA's Shuttle program has produced American and foreign politicians. In 1985, Senator Jake Garn went into space aboard the STS-51-D flight as a payload specialist and in 1986 Rep. Bill Nelson of Florida became the second sitting member of Congress to travel into space aboard Space Shuttle Columbias STS-61-C mission, also as a payload specialist. In 2012, shuttle astronaut José M. Hernández ran for Congress in California's 10th District, he won the Democratic nomination, but lost to incumbent Jeff Denham.

On February 12, 2019, four-time shuttle astronaut Mark Kelly announced that he was running in the 2020 Senate special election in Arizona to fill the seat left open by the 2018 death of John McCain. In the Democratic primary, he faced only nominal opposition, winning the nomination with 99.93% of the vote. Kelly faced off against incumbent Senator Martha McSally (appointed by Governor Doug Ducey) on Election Day, winning with a margin of about 2 points. He was sworn in on December 2, 2020. Kelly was reelected in the 2022 Senate election, securing a full six-year term.

See also
 Good Bye, Lenin!, 2003 comedy in which a lookalike of cosmonaut Sigmund Jähn pretends to be leader of East Germany

References